"Paradise" is a song by English band Sade from their third studio album, Stronger Than Pride (1988). It was released in May 1988 as the album's second single. It is Sade's most successful track on the US Billboard Hot R&B/Hip-Hop Songs chart, peaking at number one for one week. The single also reached number 16 on the Billboard Hot 100 and number 21 on the Billboard Dance Club Songs chart. "Paradise" is often considered one of the band's signature songs, alongside "Smooth Operator" (1984), "The Sweetest Taboo" (1985), and "No Ordinary Love" (1992).

Composition
"Paradise" is written in the key of F minor in common time with a tempo of 102 beats per minute. Adu's vocals span from F3 to A♭4.

Reception
The song was described as "swaggering" and "sinewy" by Lloyd Bradley of BBC Music. Pan-European magazine Music & Media viewed it as a "brooding, percussion-orientated, summery track. Highly swinging through its persistent, up-tempo, although at the same time somehow restrained, groove." Frank Guan of Vulture commented, "Any song titled 'Paradise' had better sound like it, and her version doesn't disappoint – in fact, no song better expresses the phase of love where disappointment is impossible."

Track listings

7-inch single
A. "Paradise" (remix) – 3:35
B. "Paradise" (instrumental) – 4:00

12-inch single
A. "Paradise" (extended remix) – 5:33
B1. "Paradise" (extended instrumental) – 4:01
B2. "Paradise" (extra beats) – 2:11

UK and European CD single
"Paradise" (extended version) – 5:30
"Hang On to Your Love" (US remix) – 5:13
"Keep Hangin' On" (live) – 2:59
"Paradise" (instrumental) – 4:02

US mini CD single
"Paradise" (remix) – 3:35
"Super Bien Total" – 4:03

Japanese mini CD single
"Paradise" (remix) – 3:39
"Paradise" (instrumental) – 4:03

Charts

Weekly charts

Year-end charts

References

1988 singles
1988 songs
Epic Records singles
Sade (band) songs
Song recordings produced by Mike Pela
Songs written by Sade (singer)
Songs written by Stuart Matthewman